Love's Christmas Journey is a 2011 made-for-television Christian drama film based on a series of books by Janette Oke. It aired on Hallmark Channel on November 5, 2011.

Synopsis 
The story focuses on Ellie King (née Davis) and Aaron Davis, the now adult children of Clark and Marty Davis and half-siblings of Missy Davis. Clark and Marty were introduced in Love Comes Softly along with Clark's daughter Missy. While the rest of the films, excluding the prequels, follow the lives of Missy and, eventually, her family, this story does not include her and is set at an unspecified point, part way through the series.

Cast

References

External links
 Love Comes Softly Series site at Hallmark Channel
 

2011 television films
2011 films
2010s Christmas drama films
American Christmas drama films
American sequel films
Hallmark Channel original films
Love Comes Softly (TV film series)
Television sequel films
Films directed by David S. Cass Sr.
American drama television films
2010s American films